The Baraba (Siberian Tatar: параба, бараба, барама, бараба татарлар) are a sub-group of Siberian Tatars and the indigenous people of the Ob-Irtysh interfluve. After a strenuous resistance to Russian conquest and much suffering at a later period from Kyrgyz and Kalmyk raids, they now live by agriculture — either in separate villages or along with Russians. Some of them still speak Baraba dialect of Siberian Tatar language. They traditionally live on the Baraba steppe.

Population 

They were first mentioned as a separate ethnic group in the Russian Empire Census in 1897 and First All-Union Census of the Soviet Union in 1926. According to 1897 Census their population was 4,433. In 1926 there were 7,528 Baraba Tatars.

Ethnographers estimated that their population reached 8,380 in 1971.

According to the data of the Institute of Philology of the Siberian Branch of the RAS, there were 8,000 Baraba Tatars in Novosibirsk Oblast in 2012.

History 
The Baraba Tatars are descended from Kipchak tribes who inhabited the region during the 12th and 13th centuries. The region was conquered by the Mongols in the 13th century and was incorporated into the White Horde. The Baraba Tatars lived in the eastern portion of the Khanate of Sibir when it was established in the 15th century. 

The Russians subjugated the Baraba Tatars in the 18th century. During the 19th century, the autonomy of the Baraba Tatars eroded away due to the influx of Russian setters to the region and the high taxes imposed on them by the Russian state. The Russian settlers pushed out the Baraba from more fertile lands.

The Dzungar Khanate extracted yasaq (tribute) from their Baraba Muslim underlings. Converting to Orthodox Christianity and becoming Russian subjects was a tactic by the Baraba to find an excuse not to pay yasaq to the Dzungars. Since Muslim Siberian Bukharans had legal advantages and privileges under Russia, Barabas pretended to be them.

Culture 
The Baraba Tatars are Sunni Muslims. They adopted Islam at around the latter half of the 18th century. However, the Baraba Tatars may have been exposed to Islam as early as the late 16th century and some may have been Muslim by the early 17th century.

Baraba Tatars have traditionally engaged in hunting, fishing, agriculture, and breeding some cattle and horses.

Genetics
The most common Y-DNA haplogroup among Baraba Tatars is the haplogroup Q, specifically the Q-YP4000 and Q-L330 subclades. Among northern Baraba Tatars, the most widespread is haplogroup N1b-P43. Other, less common haplogroups are R1a1-Z93 and R1b-M73.

Sources 

Wixman, Ronald. The Peoples of the USSR: An Ethnographic Handbook (Armonk: M. E. Shapre, 1984) p. 22

References

External links 
 Information about Baraba Tatars

Siberian Tatars
Novosibirsk Oblast
Omsk Oblast
Indigenous peoples of North Asia